E-Trax is a duo consisting of Jens Lissat and Ramon Zenker. Their 2001 song, Let's Rock, made #60 on the UK Singles Chart.

References

Electronic music duos
German house music groups